William Candlett (1847 – 20 June 1904) was an English cricketer. Born at Newton in Lancashire, Candlett was a right-handed batsman who bowled right-arm medium pace.

He made one appearance in first-class cricket for Kent County Cricket Club against Yorkshire in 1880 at Mote Park in Maidstone.

He died at Salford in Lancashire on 20 June 1904.

References

External links

1847 births
1904 deaths
People from Hyde, Greater Manchester
English cricketers
Kent cricketers